Kashim Ibrahim Library is one of Africa's biggest academic library located in the main campus of Ahmadu Bello University in Zaria, Nigeria. It is commonly referred to as KIL by the Abusites. The various collections and services in the library has raised great personalities, politicians and renowned knowledgeable people.

The library is one of the  oldest academic libraries in Nigeria in terms of good facilities, stable internet connection and access to E-library. The university librarian is Professor Doris Bozimo The current University Librarian name is Abdulhamid Gambo which is acting Librarian.

History 
The University Library complex was established in 1963 along side the university with the purpose of serving the entire University community. The present library building was formally opened in December 1976, by Alhaji Sir Kashim Ibrahim, after whom it is named. the building has capacity for about 500,000 volumes of books and 2000 readers at a time.

Structure 
There is main library which is a three-storey building located in the main campus, it is made up of different departments and offices. The library has specialized divisions like serial section, Reference section, CD-ROMS Search Room, Media division, Reserved Books Unit and Casual Reading parlour. Other branches of the library are found in the teaching hospital and outside the state where the university, Zaria.

Collections 
There are about 160,000 books and 5138 journals at Kashim Ibrahim library with collections for arts and social sciences  located In the first floor, while  those for physical sciences, medical and engineering found in the second floor. The Library has several sections that houses all the collections which are as follows:

 Human Resource Development
 Information Resource Development
 Information Resource Processing
 Serial divisions
 Media division
 Information and Communication Technology (ICT)
 Customers Service Division

How to Locate A Book in the Library 
The Manual catalogue and OPAC with the help of this maximum use of the library is made ease for a reader to find out whether a certain book is in the stock of the library (provided the title or the author's name is known).

Satelite Libraries 
Kashim Ibrahim Library has Satelite libraries that support teaching, learning and research which are as follows:

 Agricultural Library in Institute of Agricultural Research at samaru which provide information Resource in agriculture sciennce.
 Medical Library for faculty of medicine which is situated in Institute of health.
 Lee T. Railsback Library that serve the faculty of Veterinary medicine, pharmaceutical Science.
 President Kennedy Library at Kongo campus that serve faculty of administration.
 Law Library serve faculty of law in Kongo campus
 Centre for Islamic legal studies library at Kongo campus
 National Animal production Research institute (NAPRI)

See also 
Kanuri people
List of libraries in Nigeria
List of academic libraries

References

External links 
 ABU site- Kashim Ibrahim Library/

Academic libraries in Nigeria
Ahmadu Bello University